Vogt House may refer to:

Vogt House (Iowa City, Iowa), listed on the National Register of Historic Places in Johnson County, Iowa
 Evon Zartman Vogt Ranch House, listed on the NRHP in New Mexico
 Vogt House (Brownville, New York), listed on the NRHP in Jefferson County, New York